Ifeoma Nnenna Dieke (born 25 February 1981) is an American-born Scottish football defender, currently playing for Apollon Ladies F.C. of the Cypriot First Division. She previously played for several professional clubs in Sweden and the United States. Between 2004 and 2017, she won 123 caps for the Scotland women's national football team. Dieke was born in Amherst, Massachusetts, to Nigerian parents, moving to Cumbernauld in Scotland when she was three years old. Dieke and fellow Scot Kim Little were the only non-English players selected in the Great Britain squad for the 2012 London Olympics.

Club career 
Dieke started her football career when she was eight years old, playing for her primary school St Mary's. She later joined Cumbernauld Cosmos, from where she moved to Cumbernauld Ladies.  In 1999, she was awarded a scholarship by Florida International University, playing for the university's FIU Golden Panthers women's soccer team.  She graduated in 2003 and joined Women's United Soccer Association side Atlanta Beat.  She started eight of 13 regular season games and scored one goal. The league folded at the end of her first season, and Dieke later played in Sweden (for QBIK in 2007 and for Kristianstads DFF in 2008) and Cyprus.

In 2009, she joined the Chicago Red Stars. In the inaugural 2009 Women's Professional Soccer season, Dieke appeared in 14 games. She was sent off for fouling Kelley O'Hara during the Red Stars' 2–0 defeat to FC Gold Pride in May 2010. The following month she was allowed to move to the Boston Breakers on a free transfer. She started 12 of her 13 appearances for the Breakers in 2010, scoring one goal against her former employers Chicago, for whom she had made five early season appearances.

During the WPS offseason in 2011, Dieke joined Cypriot club Apollon Limassol on loan from the Breakers. The WPS folded ahead of the 2012 season and Dieke returned to Sweden, signing for Damallsvenskan newcomers Vittsjö GIK. Despite missing almost the entire 2013 Damallsvenskan season through injury, Dieke was given a new contract by Vittsjö ahead of 2014.

In January 2018, Dieke left Vittsjö after six seasons. In search of a new challenge, she joined newly promoted Damallsvenkan club IFK Kalmar. The move was not successful and with Kalmar adrift at the foot of the league table, Dieke was dropped from the team and released during the mid-season break. It was reported that she was unhappy at Kalmar's failure to strengthen their playing squad. She returned to Apollon in September 2018.

International career 
Dieke was eligible to represent either Scotland, the United States or Nigeria at international level. She made her Scotland debut in January 2004 against Greece and earned her 50th cap against Northern Ireland in May 2009.

In October 2008 she scored an own goal in a UEFA Women's Euro 2009 qualifying play-off against Russia in Nalchik. The tie finished 4–4 and Scotland were eliminated on the away goals rule, much to Dieke's disappointment: "It hit off my shin, and for me that was the one that knocked us out because it was an away goal. I was beating myself up quite a bit for that."

In 2012 Dieke was selected for a place in the Great Britain team at the 2012 London Olympics. Along with Scotland teammate Kim Little, Dieke was one of only two non-English players in the squad. She played alongside Casey Stoney in central defence, but suffered knee ligament damage in the second group match and had to withdraw from the squad. Medical tests showed that she had ruptured an anterior cruciate ligament, which prevented her from playing in the remainder of Scotland's UEFA Women's Euro 2013 qualifying matches.

After missing almost two years of international football due to the injury, Dieke was recalled to Scotland's squad for the 2014 Cyprus Women's Cup. That October she won her 100th cap in Scotland's 2–0 2015 FIFA Women's World Cup qualification – UEFA play-offs defeat by the Netherlands in Rotterdam.

Dieke remained in Scotland's team for UEFA Women's Euro 2017 qualifying. With teammate Jo Love, she was awarded a special cap in October 2015 as part of a UEFA-backed programme to honour players with 100 or more appearances for their national teams.

When Scotland secured qualification for their first ever major tournament at UEFA Women's Euro 2017, after several near misses, 36-year-old veteran Dieke announced that she would be retiring from international football afterwards. She played in all three games as Scotland made a limp group stage exit, then confirmed her decision to retire the following month.

Playing style
Team GB coach Hope Powell said of Dieke: "Ife's a great defender one-v-one. She probably prefers a centre-half role but can play anywhere along the back." Writing in The Herald in 2017, sports journalist Alan Campbell described Dieke as: "[a] quick and tactically astute central defender".

Personal life
Dieke is often referred to by the hypocorism "Ife" (or "Iffy"). She can speak the Igbo language.

References

External links 

 
 
 
Profile at Swedish Football Association (SvFF) 

1981 births
Living people
Black British sportswomen
Scottish women's footballers
Scotland women's international footballers
Women's United Soccer Association players
FIU Panthers women's soccer players
Atlanta Beat (WUSA) players
Chicago Red Stars players
Boston Breakers players
American emigrants to Scotland
American sportspeople of Nigerian descent
British sportspeople of Nigerian descent
Scottish people of Nigerian descent
Footballers at the 2012 Summer Olympics
Olympic footballers of Great Britain
Sportspeople from Amherst, Massachusetts
People from Cumbernauld
Kristianstads DFF players
Damallsvenskan players
Vittsjö GIK players
QBIK players
FIFA Century Club
IFK Kalmar players
Women's association football defenders
Expatriate women's footballers in Sweden
Expatriate women's footballers in Cyprus
Apollon Ladies F.C. players
Scottish expatriate women's footballers
Scottish expatriate sportspeople in the United States
Expatriate women's soccer players in the United States
Footballers from North Lanarkshire
African-American women's soccer players
American women's soccer players
Sportspeople of Nigerian descent
21st-century African-American women
20th-century African-American women
Women's Professional Soccer players
UEFA Women's Euro 2017 players